The Laos National Stadium or formally Anouvong Stadium (official name), also known as Vientiane Provincial stadium, is a multi-purpose stadium in Vientiane, Laos. It is named after Chao Anouvong, King of Vientiane. It is used mostly for football matches. The stadium holds 20,000 people. Since 2008, some matches of the Lao League have been played there.

References

Football venues in Laos
Athletics (track and field) venues in Laos
Rugby union stadiums in Asia
Buildings and structures in Vientiane